Stroup may refer to:

People
 Andrew Stroup (born 1985), Korean-American engineer and entrepreneur
 Carrie Stroup (born 1982), American fashion model, TV host, and beauty pageant titleholder
 Dan Stroup (born 1968), Canadian lacrosse coach
 George Stroup (born 1944), American professor and minister
 Jessica Stroup (born 1986), American actress
 Keith Stroup, American attorney; founder of the National Organization for the Reform of Marijuana Laws
 Richard L. Stroup, American free-market environmentalist and economics professor
 Sheila Stroup (born 1943), American columnist
 Stanley Stroup (1904–1977), American politician; member of the Pennsylvania State Senate
 Theodore G. Stroup (born 1940), retired United States Army Lieutenant General
 Chuck Stroup, American student involved in the 1969 Zip to Zap riot
 Jane S. Shaw (also Jane Shaw Stroup), American free-market environmentalist, editor, and journalist

Places
 Stroup Peak, a peak in Victoria Land, Antarctica
 Garth Stroup Home, a historic home in Mishawaka, St. Joseph County, Indiana, U.S.

See also
 Stroop (disambiguation)